Michael Barnathan is an American film producer who has produced and executive-produced films such as Used People, The Help, the first three Harry Potter films, Rent, Cheaper by the Dozen and Night at the Museum. He was also a producer for the 2010 film adaptation Percy Jackson & the Olympians: The Lightning Thief and 2013 Percy Jackson: Sea of Monsters, based on the novels by Rick Riordan.

Barnathan graduated from Tisch School of the Arts of New York University in 1980.

Barnathan is Jewish.

Filmography

Film

Miscellaneous crew

Thanks

Television

Production manager

References

External links

American film producers
Living people
Tisch School of the Arts alumni
Year of birth missing (living people)